The 2008–09 season of Aldershot Town Football Club was the 17th year of football played by the club and the first season in Football League Two, the highest level achieved by the club up to that time.

Team kit 

The team kit for the 2008–09 season is produced by Carbrini Sportswear. The home shirt will be primarily Red with blue panels with the away shirt being yellow. On 6 December 2008 the blue third kit was launched.

Match results

Friendlies

Football League Two

League Two Table

FA Cup

Football League Cup 
This was Aldershot Town's first ever season playing in the Football League Cup.

Football League Trophy 

 *Swindon Town won 7–6 on penalties.

Hampshire Senior Cup 

The Hampshire Senior Cup squad from Aldershot Town was composed of reserve team players.

Events 

This is a list of the significant events to occur at the club during the 2008–09 season, presented in chronological order. This list does not include match results, which are in the results section.

May 2008 

 13 May: Aldershot Town's first signing since winning promotion to the Football League is Dean Howell from Conference National side Rushden & Diamonds.
 15 May: Gary Waddock signs 25-year-old defender Chris Blackburn from Football League One side Swindon Town.
 19 May: Aldershot Town's third signing since promotion is Woking F.C. striker Marvin Morgan.
 27 May: Goalkeeper Nikki Bull signed a new two-year deal to stay with the club. However this was a surprise to many as it came just four days after the Chairman John McGinty released an official statement informing supporters of his departure after six years with the club. The Shots also confirmed on the official website that Captain Rhys Day had signed a one-year contract with the club and that Junior Mendes was committing until the end of the year (2008).

June 2008 

 13 June: Aldershot Town are drawn against Coventry City in the Carling Cup First Round draw.
 16 June: The fixtures for the Football League Two season are released. The Shots will travel to Accrington Stanley on the opening day of the season. It will be exactly five years to the weekend when the two sides were paired together in the opening Conference season of 2003/2004.
 24 June: Manager Gary Waddock and Coach Martin Kuhl both sign new three-year deals with the club.
 25 June: Joel Grant joins Crewe Alexandra for a fee of £130,000, a club record sale.

July 2008 

 15 July: It is announced that Jim Joyce has left Yeovil Town Football Club to join the Shots to take over from Sue Bowen as Club Physio.
 23 July: The Shots sign 21-year-old Sheffield United Academy product Ben Starosta on a one-month loan deal, with a view to securing a permanent deal. They also boosted their squad by securing the services of Scott Davies on a second season-long loan from Reading FC.

November 2008 

 18 November: Godalming Town defeated Aldershot Town XI 3–0 in a testimonial held for Paul 'Paddy' Hampshire who is battling against the incurable motor neuron disease and proceeds from the game were shared out between the Hampshire family's chosen charities; Woking Hospice and the M.N.D. charity.
 29 November: Nikki Bull makes his 300th appearance for the Shots in the FA Cup defeat at Millwall Football Club.

December 2008 

 6 December: New third kit launched.
 13 December: Following an 11.30am pitch inspection Aldershot's League Two fixture against Rotherham United at the Don Valley Stadium was called off because of a waterlogged pitch.
 18 December: The 9th Annual ATFC Christmas Carol Service was conducted by Chaplain, Rev Mike Pusey at Holy Trinity Church, Aldershot with players in attendance.
 22 December: Football League clubs voted to introduce a 'Home Grown Players' rule, as proposed by The Football League Board, at a specially arranged EGM of clubs at Derby County. The new rule will come into effect from the beginning of next season. The 'Home Grown Players' rule will require at least four players from clubs' sixteen man matchday squads to be registered domestically, for a minimum of three seasons, prior to their 21st birthday.
 28 December: Dagenham & Redbridge become the first side to beat Aldershot at the Recreation Ground in the Football League and snap an eleven-month unbeaten streak that lasted 20 league games. The previous home league defeat came back in January 2008 when Forest Green Rovers won 1–0.

January 2009 

 2 January: Andy Sandell joins in a permanent move following a successful loan spell from Salisbury City while Shots defender Dave Winfield moves in the opposite direction on a month-long loan deal.
 3 January: Aldershot's home league game against Notts County was postponed at 1.20pm when referee Chris Sarginson deemed the pitch unplayable.

February 2009 

 2 February: Dave Winfield returns to Aldershot after a loan spell with Salisbury City. The club also sign goalkeeper Alex McCarthy and defender Andy Lindegaard on one-month loan deals.

March 2009 

 27 March: Stevenage Borough sign Aldershot striker Junior Mendes on loan until the end of the season.

April 2009 

 21 April: Aldershot Town announce they will release Rhys Day, Rob Elvins and Junior Mendes at the end of the season.

Head To Head 

 *Approximate figure, exact attendances are not known.

Goalscorers 

 All Competitions

References

External links 
 Official Website

Aldershot Town F.C. seasons
Aldershot Town